Prince Jean may refer to:
 Prince Jean (1928 film), a French silent film
 Prince Jean (1934 film), a French drama film
 Prince Jean, Duke of Guise (1874–1940), Orléanist claimant to the throne of France as Jean III
 Prince Jean of Luxembourg (born 1957)